Otter Creek is a stream in Wayne County in the U.S. state of Missouri. It is a tributary of St. Francis River within Lake Wappapello.

Otter Creek most likely was so named on account of otters near its course.

See also
List of rivers of Missouri

References

Rivers of Wayne County, Missouri
Rivers of Missouri